Dithinozerconidae is a monotypic family of mites in the order Mesostigmata. Its sole genus is Dithinozercon, which itself only contains a single species, Dithinozercon halberti.

References

Mesostigmata
Acari families

Monotypic arachnid genera
Acari genera
Monogeneric arthropod families